Alisa Margolis (born 1975 in Kiev, Ukraine) is an artist based in Berlin.

Margolis graduated at the Columbia University in New York in 1997 and her MFA fellowship at de Ateliers in Amsterdam in 2003.

Her work has been shown internationally in many exhibitions, including Expander at the Royal Academy of Arts, London (2004), the 2nd Prague Biennale (2005), The Triumph of Painting at the Saatchi Gallery (2005), Walker Evans and the Barn at the Stedelijk Museum in Amsterdam (2009) and the first Prinzessinnengarten Outdoor Sculpture Triennial in Berlin (2013).

References

Literature
Hans Ulrich Gumbrecht, Michele Robecchi, Alisa Margolis: Theory of Everything, Merz & Solitude, Berlin, 2011.

External links
images of Margolis' art on MutualArt

Living people
1975 births
21st-century Ukrainian women artists
21st-century Ukrainian painters
21st-century American painters
21st-century American women artists
American contemporary painters
Ukrainian contemporary artists
American people of Ukrainian-Jewish descent